Film International is a quarterly academic journal (with a companion site, FilmInt, containing exclusive content) covering film studies. Established in 1973 (in Swedish), Film International became an English-language journal in 2003. It is published by Intellect Ltd. and presents critical, historical, and theoretical essays on film, television, and moving image studies, including book reviews, interviews, and coverage of film festivals around the world. It regularly features film reviews, interviews with directors, actors, and cinematographers, as well as covering national cinemas on a country-by-country basis. The content ranges throughout topics of the moving image, from art cinema, foreign films, genre works. and music videos, like Beyonce's Lemonade. 

The editor-in-chief is Daniel Lindvall and the co-editor is Matthew Sorrento. The image editor is Travis R. Merchant-Knudsen. The contributing editors are Jessica Baxter, Jacob Mertens, Liza Palmer, Yun-hua Chen, Christopher Sharrett, Jeremy Carr, Robert K. Lightning, George Toles, Tony Williams, and Alexandra Heller-Nicholas.

Andre Gregory has described the journal as "of enormous interest to anyone who is passionate about film," while Robert Pulcini has commented that FilmInt offers "a level of writing about film that is unfortunately all too rare these days." Works from the journal have been adapted in longer studies by top scholars and authors, including Toles, Carl Freedman, Carol Vernallis, and Murray Pomerance. David Hudson of The Criterion Collection regards the journal as a standout in book reviewing. Groundbreaking critic Robin Wood was a longtime contributor.

Abstracting and indexing 
The journal is abstracted and indexed in:

References

External links 
 
 Companion site (exclusive content)

Film studies journals
Television studies journals
Bimonthly journals
Publications established in 2003
English-language journals